Amblyseius abbasovae is a species of mite in the family Phytoseiidae.

References

abbasovae
Articles created by Qbugbot
Animals described in 1971